Harold Hirst Innes  (26 March 1909 – 30 January 1985) was a New Zealand salesman, dairy industry negotiator and marketer, businessman, company director, local politician, and philanthropist. He was born in Hamilton, New Zealand, on 26 March 1909.

In the 1974 Queen's Birthday Honours, Innes was appointed a Commander of the Order of the British Empire, for services to the community.

References

1909 births
1985 deaths
20th-century New Zealand businesspeople
New Zealand philanthropists
People from Hamilton, New Zealand
New Zealand Commanders of the Order of the British Empire
20th-century New Zealand politicians
Hamilton City Councillors
20th-century philanthropists